In the early modern period, a court Jew, or court factor (קאַורט פאַקטאַר, Kourt Faktor), was a Jewish banker who handled the finances of, or lent money to, European, mainly German, royalty and nobility. In return for their services, court Jews gained social privileges, including, in some cases, being granted noble status.

Examples of what would be later called court Jews emerged in the High Middle Ages when the royalty, the nobility, and the church borrowed money from money changers or employed them as financiers. Among the most notable of these were Aaron of Lincoln and Vivelin of Strasbourg. Jewish financiers could use their family connections to provide their sponsors with finance, food, arms, ammunition, gold, and precious metals. 

The rise of the absolute monarchies in Central Europe brought many Jews, mostly of Ashkenazi origin, into the position of negotiating loans for the various courts. They could amass personal fortunes and gain political and social influence.  However, the court Jew had social connections and influence in the Christian world mainly through the Christian nobility and church. Due to the precarious position of Jews, some nobles could ignore their debts. If the sponsoring noble died, his Jewish financier could face exile or execution. The most famous example of this occurred in Württemberg when, after the death of his sponsor Charles Alexander in 1737, Joseph Süß Oppenheimer was put on trial and executed. In an effort to avoid such fate, some court bankers in the late 18th century—such as Samuel Bleichröder, Mayer Amschel Rothschild, or Aron Elias Seligmann—successfully detached their businesses from these courts and established what eventually developed into full-fledged banks.

Background 

Prohibited from nearly every other trade, some Jews began to occupy an economic niche as moneylenders in the Middle Ages. Only they were allowed to take interest on loans, since—while the Church condemned usury universally—canon law was only applied to Christians and not to Jews. Eventually, a sizable sector of the Jewish community were engaged in financial occupations, and the community was a financially highly successful part of the medieval economy. The religious restrictions on moneylending had inadvertently created a source of monopoly rents, causing profits associated with moneylending to be higher than they otherwise would have been. By most parameters, the standard of living of the Jewish community in Early Medieval period was at least equal to that of the lower nobility. However, despite this economic prosperity, the community was not safe: religious hostility increased to the extent that it manifested itself in the form of massacres and expulsions, culminating in the repetitive expulsion of all Jews from various parts of Western Europe in the late medieval period.

Although the phenomenon of "Court Jewry" did not occur until the early 17th century, examples of what would be later called court Jews can be found earlier in Jewish moneylenders who accumulated enough capital to finance the royalty and the nobility. Among them was Josce of Gloucester, the Jewish financier who funded Richard de Clare, 2nd Earl of Pembroke's conquest of Ireland in 1170, and Aaron of Lincoln, presumably the wealthiest individual in 12th-century Britain, who left an estate of about £100,000. Also notable was Vivelin of Strasbourg, one of the wealthiest persons in Europe in the early 14th century, who lent 340,000 florins to Edward III of England on the eve of the Hundred Years' War, in 1339. By the 16th century, Jewish financiers became increasingly connected to rulers and courts. Josef Goldschmidt (d. 1572) of Frankfurt, also known as "Jud Joseph zum Goldenen Schwan", became the most important Jewish businessman of his era, trading not only with the Fuggers and Imhoffs, but also with the nobility and the Church. In the early 17th century the Habsburgs employed the services of Jacob Bassevi of Prague, Joseph Pincherle of Gorizia, and Moses and Jacob Marburger of Gradisca.

At the dawn of mercantilism, while most Sephardi Jews were primarily active in the west in maritime and colonial trade, the Ashkenazi Jews in the service of the emperor and princes tended toward domestic trade. They were mostly wealthy businessmen, distinguished above their co-religionists by their commercial instincts and their adaptability. Court Jews frequently came into conflict with court rivals and co-religionists.

The court Jews, as the agents of the rulers, and in times of war as the purveyors and the treasurers of the state, enjoyed special privileges. They were under the jurisdiction of the court marshal, and were not compelled to wear the Jews' badge. They were permitted to stay wherever the Emperor held his court, and to live anywhere in the Holy Roman Empire, even in places where no other Jews were allowed. Wherever they settled they could buy houses, slaughter meat according to the Jewish ritual, and maintain a rabbi. They could sell their goods wholesale and retail, and could not be taxed or assessed higher than the Christians.  Jews were sometimes assigned the role of local tax collectors.

At the Austrian court 
The Holy Roman Emperors from the House of Habsburg kept a considerable number of court Jews. Among those of Emperor Ferdinand II are mentioned the following: Solomon and Ber Mayer, who furnished cloth for four squadrons of cavalry for the wedding of the Emperor and Eleonora of Mantua; Joseph Pincherle of Görz; Moses and Joseph Marburger (Morpurgo) of Gradisca; Ventura Pariente of Trieste; the physician Elijah Chalfon of Vienna; Samuel zum Drachen, Samuel zum Straussen, and Samuel zum Weissen Drachen of Frankfurt am Main; and Mordecai Meisel of Prague. A specially favored court Jew was Jacob Bassevi, the first Jew to be ennobled, with the title "von Treuenberg".

Important as court Jews were also Samuel Oppenheimer, who went from Heidelberg to Vienna, and Samson Wertheimer (Wertheimher) from Worms. Oppenheimer, who was appointed chief court factor, together with his two sons Emanuel and Wolf, and Wertheimer, who was at first associated with him, devoted their time and talents to the service of Austria and the House of Habsburg: during the Rhenish, French, Turkish, and Spanish wars they loaned millions of florins for provisions, munitions, etc. Wertheimer, who, by title at least, was also chief court factor to the electors of Mainz, the Electorate of the Palatinate, and Treves, received from the emperor a chain of honor with his miniature.

Samson Wertheimer was succeeded as court factor by his son Wolf. Contemporaneous with him was Leffmann Behrends, of Hanover, court factor and agent of the elector Ernest Augustus and of the duke Rudolf August of Brunswick. He also had relationships with several other rulers and high dignitaries. Behrends' two sons, Mordecai Gumpel and Isaac, received the same titles as he, chief court factors and agents. Isaac Cohen's father-in-law, Behrend Lehman, called also Bärmann Halberstadt, was a court factor of Saxony, with the title of "Resident"; and his son Lehman Behrend was called to Dresden as court factor by King Augustus the Strong. Moses Bonaventura of Prague was also court Jew of Saxony in 1679.

Intrigues of court Jews 
The Models were court Jews of the margraves of Ansbach about the middle of the seventeenth century. Especially influential was Marx Model, who had the largest business in the whole principality and extensively supplied the court and the army. He fell into disgrace through the intrigues of the court Jew Elkan Fränkel, member of a family that had been driven from Vienna. Fränkel, a circumspect, energetic, and proud man, possessed the confidence of the margrave to such a degree that his advice was sought in the most important affairs of the state. Denounced by a certain Isaiah Fränkel, however, who desired to be baptized, an accusation was brought against Elkan Fränkel; and the latter was pilloried, scourged, and sent to the Würzburg for life imprisonment on November 2, 1712. He died there in 1720.

David Rost, Gabriel Fränkel, and, in 1730, Isaac Nathan (Ischerlein) were court Jews together with Elkan Fränkel; Ischerlein, through the intrigues of the Fränkels, suffered the same fate as Elkan Fränkel. Nevertheless, Nathan's son-in-law, Dessauer, became court Jew. Other court Jews of the princes of Ansbach were Michael Simon and Löw Israel (1743), Meyer Berlin, and Amson Solomon Seligmann (1763).

The Great Elector 
The Great Elector, Frederick William, also kept a court Jew at Berlin, Israel Aaron (1670), who by his influence tried to prevent the influx of foreign Jews into the Prussian capital. Other court Jews of the elector were Elias Gumperz in Cleves (died 1672), Berend Wulff (1675), and Solomon Fränkel (1678). More influential than any of these was Jost Liebmann. Through his marriage with the widow of the above-named Israel Aaron, he succeeded to the latter's position, and was highly esteemed by the elector. He had continual quarrels with the court Jew of the crown prince, Markus Magnus. After his death, his influential position fell to his widow, the well-known Liebmannin, who was so well received by Frederick III (from 1701 King Frederick I of Prussia) that she could go unannounced into his cabinet.

Other German courts
There were court Jews at all the petty German courts; e.g., Zacharias Seligmann (1694) in the service of the Prince of Hesse-Homburg, and others in the service of the dukes of Mecklenburg. Others mentioned toward the end of the seventeenth century are: Bendix and Ruben Goldschmidt of Hamburg; Michael Hinrichsen of Glückstadt in Mecklenburg, who soon associated himself with Moses Israel Fürst, and whose son, Ruben Hinrichsen, in 1750 had a fixed salary as court agent. About this time the court agent Wolf lived at the court of Frederick III of Mecklenburg-Strelitz. Disputes with the court Jews often led to protracted lawsuits.

The last actual court Jews were Israel Jacobson, court agent of Brunswick, and Wolf Breidenbach, factor to the Elector of Hesse, both of whom occupy honorable positions in the history of the Jews.

Examples of court Jews 
In rough chronological order:
 Abraham Senior (1412–1493)
 Isaac Abravanel (1437–1508), financier for Portuguese and Spanish courts
 Sir Edward Brampton (c. 1440–1508), a godson of King Edward IV, he was made the governor of Guernsey
 Abraham Zacuto (c. 1450–c. 1510)
 Moses and  Rachel Fishel of Kraków, court Jews during the reign of John I Albert of Poland; Rachel was lady-in-waiting of the Queen Mother Elizabeth
Josel of Rosheim (de) (1476–1554)
Joseph Nasi (1524–1579), court Jew in the Ottoman Empire and Duke of Naxos
Mordecai Meisel (Miška Marek Meisel) (1528–1601)
Jacob Bassevi von Treuenberg (a noble) (1580–1634)
Chajim Fürst (ca. 1580–1653), court agent in Hamburg, elder of the Jewish community in Hamburg, richest Jew in Hamburg
Moses Israel Fürst (1617–1692), court agent in Hamburg and Mecklenburg–Schwerin
Leffmann Behrends (Liepmann Cohen) of Hanover (c. 1630–1714)
Samuel Oppenheimer (1635–1703), military supplier for the Holy Roman Emperor
Esther Liebmann (1649–1714), court Jew to King Frederick I of Prussia
Samson Wertheimer (1658–1724), Austrian financier, chief rabbi of Hungary and Moravia, and rabbi of Eisenstadt
Issachar Berend Lehmann; de (1661–1730)
Baron Peter Shafirov (1670–1739), vice-chancellor of Russia under Peter the Great
Joseph Süß Oppenheimer (1698–1738), financier for Charles Alexander, Duke of Württemberg
Aaron Beer († 1740) of Aurich and Frankfurt
Löw Sinzheim (c. 1675–1744), court purveyor of Mainz
 Israel Edler von Hönigsberg (1724–1789), court agent and lessee of the tobacco monopoly from the Habsburgs. "Bankaldirektor" for Joseph II. First Austrian Jew to be ennobled without converting to Christianity (1789).
Joachim Edler von Popper (1720–1795), court agent and lessee of the tobacco monopoly from the Habsburgs. Second Austrian Jew to be ennobled without needing to be converted (1790).
Daniel Itzig (1723–1799), a court Jew of Frederick II the Great and Frederick William II of Prussia
Raphael Kaulla († 1810), court Jew of the Duke of Württemberg
Karoline Kaulla (1739–1809), court Jew of the Duke of Württemberg
Mayer Amschel Rothschild (1744–1812), "court factor" for William I, Elector of Hesse
Israel Jacobson (1768–1828), philanthropist and reformer, court agent of Brunswick
Wolf Breidenbach (1751–1829), factor to the Elector of Hesse, father of Moritz Wilhelm August Breidenbach
Bernhard von Eskeles (1753–1839), a court Jew of Joseph II and Francis II of the Holy Roman Empire and I of Austria

Court Jews outside Germany
 Aaron of Lincoln (12th century) 
 Elias of London (13th century) 

In fiction, Isaac the Jew in Walter Scott's Ivanhoe serves this purpose to Prince John and other nobles.

See also 
Crown rabbi
Hakham Bashi
Jewish heraldry
Jewish oath
Judenhut
Landesrabbiner
List of British Jewish nobility and gentry
List of European Jewish nobility
Schutzjude
Shtadlan
Useful Jew

Notes

References

Further reading

External links 

 
Court titles
Historical economic occupations